The Battle of Paderborn occurred during the Western Allied invasion of Germany. Most notably the commander of the 3rd Armored Division Major General Maurice Rose was killed in an ambush outside of Paderborn on March 30. He was the highest ranking US General to be killed in action on the Western Front of World War II.

Prelude 
During the final weeks of March, American forces were racing into Germany, with George Patton's 3rd Army crossing the Rhine river and the 1st Army fighting for the Remagen bridgehead. Field Marshall Bernard Montgomery's 21st Army Group was also crossing the last natural barrier into the Ruhr Area.

References

Further reading

External links 
The Death of Maj. Gen. Maurice Rose
Video documentary with battle map

Battles of World War II involving Germany
Battles of World War II involving the United States
March 1945 events